Stepaside Knoll is an ice-covered knoll rising to  in the north part of Stepaside Spur, between Upper Staircase and Schutt Glacier in the Skelton Glacier drainage system.

References

Mountains of the Ross Dependency
Hillary Coast